Quercus mespilifolia is a tree species in the family Fagaceae. There are no known subspecies. It is placed in subgenus Cerris, section Cyclobalanopsis.

The known distribution of Q. mespilifolia is Burma, Thailand, Laos and Vietnam: where it can be found in the Sơn La and Lang Bian areas and may be called sồi lá nhôt.

References

External links
 

mespilifolia
Flora of Indo-China
Trees of Vietnam